The Divorce Game is a 1917 American silent comedy film directed by Travers Vale and starring Alice Brady, John Bowers and Arthur Ashley. The story was adapted from the play Mlle. Fifi by Leo Ditrichstein.

Cast
 Alice Brady as Florence, Viscountess de Sallure 
 John Bowers as Paul, Viscount de Sallure 
 Arthur Ashley as Jean Le Beau 
 Kate Lester as Mrs. Safford 
 Joseph Herbert as Duke de Sallure 
 Jack Drumier as Mendoza 
 Marie La Varre as Fifi Dupet

References

Bibliography
 Langman, Larry. American Film Cycles: The Silent Era. Greenwood Publishing, 1998.

External links
 

1917 films
1917 comedy films
1910s English-language films
American silent feature films
Silent American comedy films
Films directed by Travers Vale
American black-and-white films
World Film Company films
Films shot in Fort Lee, New Jersey
1910s American films